Dr. Georgette Sobhi Kellini is an Egyptian Coptic politician and human rights activist.

Born in Cairo, Georgette Kellini holds a doctorate in international trade law. She has served as a Member of the Parliament of Egypt, and is a member of the National Council for Human Rights.

References

External references
Bikya Masr
Arab Parliamentary Conference on The UN Convention Against Corruption
Annual Report of The National Council for Human Rights

Members of the Parliament of Egypt
Egyptian people of Coptic descent
Coptic politicians
Living people
Year of birth missing (living people)